Faith Ekakitie (born April 25, 1993) is a professional former Canadian football defensive tackle. He was drafted first overall in the 2017 CFL Draft by the Winnipeg Blue Bombers of the Canadian Football League (CFL). Ekakitie played college football for the Iowa Hawkeyes. He was also a member of the Montreal Alouettes.

Professional career

Winnipeg Blue Bombers 
Ekakitie was drafted first overall in the 2017 CFL Draft by the Blue Bombers and signed with the team on May 7, 2017 to a three-year contract. In his rookie season Ekakitie dressed for 14 regular-season games and contributed only five tackles. On June 10, 2018 Ekakitie was released by the Blue Bombers.

Montreal Alouettes 
On June 14, 2018 Ekakitie signed with the Montreal Alouettes. Faith Ekakitie suffered a torn Achilles during practice on June 26, 2018, causing him to miss the entire 2018 season. He was released by the Alouettes on January 28, 2019.

Injury and Early Retirement
Following over a year of rehab on his Achilles, on July 15, 2019 Ekakitie announced his retirement from professional football. He stated that he hoped to pursue coaching and teaching in the future.

References

External links
Winnipeg Blue Bombers bio 
Iowa Hawkeyes bio

1993 births
Living people
Canadian football defensive linemen
Sportspeople from Brampton
Players of Canadian football from Ontario
Iowa Hawkeyes football players
Winnipeg Blue Bombers players